Charles and Diana may refer to the following:

Charles III and Diana, Princess of Wales
Wedding of Prince Charles and Lady Diana Spencer, in 1981
Charles & Diana: A Royal Love Story, a 1982 U.S. television film
The Royal Romance of Charles and Diana, a 1982 U.S. television film
Charles and Diana: Unhappily Ever After, a 1992 U.S. television film